Bronchocela shenlong is a species of lizard. It is endemic to Malaysia

References

Bronchocela
Reptiles described in 2015
Taxa named by Larry Lee Grismer
Taxa named by Perry L. Wood
Taxa named by Evan Quah
Taxa named by Shahrul Anuar
Taxa named by Jack W. Sites Jr.
Reptiles of the Malay Peninsula